The Small Firms Loan Guarantee (SFLG) was a UK government loan support scheme for small businesses that ran from 1981 to January 2009.

Under the scheme, participating banks could lend up to a maximum of £250,000 to eligible UK companies trading less than five years with a turnover of less than £5.6 million, and have 75% of the loss at default met by the government.

The SFLG was replaced by the Enterprise Finance Guarantee (EFG) on 14 January 2009.

See also
Enterprise Finance Guarantee

References

Economic history of the United Kingdom
Financial history of the United Kingdom